= Steel City Confessions =

1999 novel by Thomas Lipinski

- First edition
- Author: Thomas Lipinski
- Language: English
- Genre: Novel
- Publisher: Avon Twilight
- Publication date: 1999
- Publication place: USA
- Media type: Print (Paperback)
- Pages: 224
- ISBN: 0-380-79431-4
- OCLC: 40843465
- Preceded by: A Picture of Her Tombstone
- Followed by: Death in the Steel City

Steel City Confessions is a crime novel by the American writer Thomas Lipinski, first published by Avon Books in 1999. It is set in 1990s Pittsburgh, Pennsylvania.

It tells the story of Pittsburgh private detective Carroll Dorsey, who investigates parish priest Tom Crimmins in the gunning down of man, whose wife may have been having an affair with Father Tom. Simultaneously, Dorsey becomes the target of a vendetta by Pittsburgh District Attorney Douglas Turner.

The novel is the third in a series of four Carroll Dorsey mysteries.
