= A Picture of Her Tombstone =

1996 novel by Thomas Lipinski

- First edition
- Author: Thomas Lipinski
- Language: English
- Genre: Crime
- Publisher: St Martins Press
- Publication date: 1996
- Publication place: United States
- Media type: Print (hardback)
- Pages: 234
- ISBN: 0-312-14390-7
- OCLC: 34281502
- Preceded by: The Fall-Down Artist
- Followed by: Steel City Confessions

A Picture of Her Tombstone is a 1996 crime novel by American writer Thomas Lipinski, set in 1990s Pittsburgh, Pennsylvania.

It tells the story of Pittsburgh private detective Carroll Dorsey, who is making ends meet by tending bar, when an old friend tells him about a Mrs. Leneski, who wants Dorsey to find her granddaughter, Maritsa Durant. The quest leads him into a blue-collar neighborhood, a seedy drug underground, and an encounter with a beautiful state cop.

The novel is the second in a series of four Carroll Dorsey mysteries.

== Sources ==
Contemporary Authors Online. The Gale Group, 2006.
