= Death in the Steel City =

2000 novel by Thomas Lipinski

- Author: Thomas Lipinski
- Language: English
- Genre: Novel
- Publisher: Avon Twilight
- Publication date: 2000
- Publication place: United States
- Media type: Print (Paperback)
- Pages: 224
- ISBN: 0-380-79432-2
- OCLC: 43924361
- Preceded by: Steel City Confessions

Death in the Steel City is a crime novel by the American writer Thomas Lipinski, set in 1990s Pittsburgh, Pennsylvania.

It tells the story of Pittsburgh private detective Carroll Dorsey, who is hired by an aging Jewish gangster to track down an old mistress of his, a black woman. In a subplot, Dorsey's father, a powerful Pittsburgh political boss, is on his deathbed.

The novel is the fourth in a series of four Carroll Dorsey mysteries.

== Sources ==
Contemporary Authors Online. The Gale Group, 2006.
