= The Fall-Down Artist =

Crime novel by Thomas Lipinski

- First edition
- Author: Thomas Lipinski
- Language: English
- Genre: Novel
- Publisher: St Martins Press
- Publication date: 1994
- Publication place: USA
- Media type: Print (Hardback)
- Pages: 266
- ISBN: 0-312-10461-8
- OCLC: 29470288
- Followed by: A Picture of Her Tombstone

The Fall-Down Artist is a crime novel by the American writer Thomas Lipinski set in 1980s Pittsburgh, Pennsylvania.

It tells the story of Pittsburgh private detective Carroll Dorsey, whose personal life is in disarray, and who investigates a series of militant grassroots organizations dedicated to preserving the steel industry and finds violence, insurance fraud, and murder.

The novel is the first in a series of four Carroll Dorsey mysteries.

== Sources ==
Contemporary Authors Online. The Gale Group, 2006.
